JSC V.V. Tikhomirov Scientific Research Institute of Instrument Design (NIIP) is a joint stock company, one of the major Russian enterprises in the development of weaponry control systems for fighter planes and mobile medium range anti-aircraft SAM defence vehicles.

History
The institute was created on March 1, 1955 as a branch of the Moscow NII-17 by the Ministry of Aircraft Industry of the USSR Council of Ministers (Resolution No. 2436-1005, September 18, 1954). In February 1956, the NII-17 branch was reorganized into an independent enterprise, commonly known as Scientific Research Institute for Instrumentation, or NIIP.

At present, NIIP is a modern technically equipped enterprise with a developed industrial and economic infrastructure. The total area occupied by the Institute is 42000 square meters.

Products and developments

Radar Control Systems 
 N007 Zaslon complex for MiG-31

Medium Range Air Defense Missile Systems 

 2K12 Kub missile system with 3M9 missile, 1958-1967 (Kvadrat export version) - NATO codename SA-6 "Gainful"
 Kub-M1 through Kub-M4 modifications
 9К37 Buk missile system with 9M38 missile - NATO codename SA-11 "Gadfly"
 9К37М1 Buk-M1 (most common) with 9M38M1 missile
 Ural (unfinished, only prototypes built) - NATO codename SA-17 "Grizzly"
 9К317 Buk-M2 with 9M317 missile
 9К37M1-2 Buk-M1-2 (Buk-M1 upgrade for the use of Buk-M2 missile)
 9К317E Buk-M2E, recent export version of Buk-M2 ADM series featured at 2007 MAKS Airshow
 9К317M Buk-M3, current version of Buk-M3 ADM series featured at 2013 MAKS Airshow

 ABM-1 Galosh

Aircraft Weapon Control Systems 

 MiG-31 AWCS was the first that introduces an electronically scanned phased array antenna (in Soviet Army since 1981)
 SUV-27 AWCS for Su-27 and MiG-29, Su-30, Su-33, Su-35 and their modifications (developing process started in 1978)
 RLSU-27 AWCS for Su-27M is a multirole DSP radiolocator based on a slot antenna (developing process started in 1982)
 Radiolocator Targeting Complex Osa - ) - an AWCS for the light fighter jets like MiG-21, MiG-29, MiG-AT

Phased Array Antennas 
 Pero passive phased array with electronic beam scanning
 Bars, Irbis, Byelka a new generation passive phased array antennas
 Epolet-A, an X-band active phased array antenna (currently on a prototype stage)

Radar Seekers 
 N001 radar

Civil Products 
 an automated control, diagnostics and traffic safety system, universal control panel for Yauza and Rusich underground trains and passenger train cars
 Delta-Geon, a seismic signals registrator
 various OKO geological devices
 an explosives detector for checking baggage and carry-on luggage (capable of detecting substances such as RDX, HMX).
 HYDRA interferometric side-scan sonar

Notable employees

Heads of the institute
 March 1, 1955 - 1962 - Viktor Vasilievitch Tikhomirov
 1962-1969 - Yuriy Nikolaevitch Figurovsky, Doctor of Engineering, professor, laureate of the Lenin award, Hero of Socialist Labour
 1969-1973 - Sergey Afanasievitch Pecherin, laureate of the Lenin award and two orders of the Red Banner of Labour;
 1973-1978 - Viktor Konstantinovitch Grishin, Doctor of Engineering, professor, laureate of the Lenin and State awards, Hero of the Socialist Labour
 1978-1998 - Valentin Vasilievitch Matyashev, PhD in Engineering, professor, laureate of the Lenin and State awards
 since 1998 - Yuriy Ivanovitch Beliy, Honoured Radio Operator, Honoured Aircraft Engineer, member of the Scientific Technical Council of Rosoboronexport

Lead researchers and engineers
 Ardalion Rastov, designer of both Kub and Buk SAMs
 , chief designer of the institute

See also
 Phazotron-NIIR
 Vega Radio Engineering Corporation

External links 
 V.V. Tikhomirov Instrument Research and Development Institute, "The Golden Book of Moscow Business. The Year 2003"

Defence companies of the Soviet Union
Research institutes in Russia
Research institutes in the Soviet Union
Aerospace companies of the Soviet Union
Almaz-Antey
Companies based in Moscow Oblast
Ministry of Radio Industry (Soviet Union)
Electronics companies of the Soviet Union
Aircraft component manufacturers of the Soviet Union